Peter Vogel (born 5 August 1939) is a Swiss former cyclist. He competed in the tandem event at the 1960 Summer Olympics.

References

External links
 

1939 births
Living people
Swiss male cyclists
Olympic cyclists of Switzerland
Cyclists at the 1960 Summer Olympics
People from Glarus